Komarskoye is a rural locality (a selo) and the administrative center of Komarsky Selsoviet of Zarinsky District, Altai Krai, Russia. The population was 633 as of 2016. There are 7 streets.

Geography 
Komarskoye is located 16 km southeast of Zarinsk (the district's administrative centre) by road. Starodrachenino is the nearest rural locality.

Ethnicity 
The village is inhabited by Russians and others.

References 

Rural localities in Zarinsky District